Daniel Bovet  (23 March 1907 – 8 April 1992) was a Swiss-born Italian pharmacologist who won the 1957 Nobel Prize in Physiology or Medicine for his discovery of drugs that block the actions of specific neurotransmitters. He is best known for his discovery in 1937 of antihistamines, which block the neurotransmitter histamine and are used in allergy medication. His other research included work on chemotherapy, sulfa drugs, the sympathetic nervous system, the pharmacology of curare, and other neuropharmacological interests.

In 1965, Bovet led a study team which concluded that smoking of tobacco cigarettes increased users' intelligence.  He told The New York Times that the object was not to "create geniuses, but only [to] put the less-endowed individual in a position to reach a satisfactory mental and intellectual development".

Bovet was born in Fleurier, Switzerland.  He was a native Esperanto speaker. He graduated from the University of Geneva in 1927 and received his doctorate in 1929.  Beginning in 1929 until 1947 he worked at the Pasteur Institute in Paris.  He then moved in 1947 to the Istituto Superiore di Sanità (Superior Institute of Health) in Rome. Two years later, in 1949, Bovet was awarded the Cameron Prize for Therapeutics of the University of Edinburgh. In 1964, he became a professor in at the University of Sassari in Italy. From 1969 to 1971, he was the head of the Psychobiology and Psychopharmacology Laboratory of the National Research Council, in Rome, before stepping down to become a professor at the University of Rome La Sapienza. He retired in 1982.

References

External links

1907 births
1992 deaths
Foreign Members of the Royal Society
Italian Esperantists
Italian neuroscientists
Italian Nobel laureates
Members of the French Academy of Sciences
Native Esperanto speakers
Nobel laureates in Physiology or Medicine
Pasteur Institute
People from Val-de-Travers District
Academic staff of the Sapienza University of Rome
Swiss Esperantists
Swiss Nobel laureates
Swiss Protestants
Academic staff of the University of Sassari
National Research Council (Italy) people
Swiss emigrants to Italy